The following is a list of Sites of Special Scientific Interest in the Dunfermline and Kirkcaldy  Area of Search, in Scotland. For other areas, see List of SSSIs by Area of Search.

A–H
 Ballo and Harperleas Reservoirs
 Black Loch (Cleish)
 Camilla Loch
 Carlingnose
 Carriston Reservoir
 Cullaloe Reservoir
 Dalbeath Marsh
 Ferry Hills
 Firth of Forth
 Holl Meadows

I–P
 Invertiel Quarry
 Lielowan Meadow
 Lockshaw Mosses
 Long Craig Island
 Lurg and Dow Lochs
 Orrock Hill
 Otterston Loch
 Park Hill and Tipperton Mosses

R–Z
 Roscobie Hills
 Roscobie Quarry
 St Margaret's Marsh
 Star Moss
 Steelend Moss
 Swallow Craig Den
 Wether Hill

 
Dunfermline and Kirkcaldy